Waliul Karim (born 18 December 1992) is a Bangladeshi cricketer. He made his List A debut for Prime Doleshwar Sporting Club in the 2016–17 Dhaka Premier Division Cricket League on 27 May 2017. He made his Twenty20 debut for Gazi Group Cricketers in the 2018–19 Dhaka Premier Division Twenty20 Cricket League on 26 February 2019.

References

External links
 

1992 births
Living people
Bangladeshi cricketers
Gazi Group cricketers
Prime Doleshwar Sporting Club cricketers
Place of birth missing (living people)